Short-track speed skating has been a contest at the Winter Olympics since the 1992 Winter Games in Albertville, France. Prior to that, it was a demonstration sport at the 1988 games. The results from the 1988 demonstration competition are not included in the official Olympic statistics. The sport has been dominated by teams from East Asia and North America, namely South Korea, China , Canada and the United States . Those four countries have won 147 of 195 medals awarded since 1992. South Korea leads the medal tally, with 53 medals including 26 golds since 1992. The majority of medals that South Korea and China have won at the Winter Olympics come from short-track speed skating.

At the 2010 Winter Olympics, Haralds Silovs of Latvia became the first athlete in Olympic history to participate in both short track (1500m) and long track (5000m) speed skating, and the first to compete in two disciplines on the same day. After winning the 500m event at the 2014 Winter Olympics, Viktor Ahn became the first short track speedskater to have won gold medals in all four short track disciplines (500m, 1000m, 1500m, 5000m-relay). He had won 3 golds in 2014 representing Russia, and 3 in 2006 representing South Korea.

In July 2018, the International Olympic Committee (IOC) officially added the mixed relay held over a distance of 2000 metres, increasing the total number of events to nine. Due to the addition of the event, the competition schedule was increased to six days from five.

Summary

Events

Men's
• = official event, (d) = demonstration event

Women's
• = official event, (d) = demonstration event

Mixed
• = official event, (d) = demonstration event

Medal table 

Sources (after the 2022 Winter Olympics):
Accurate as of 2022 Winter Olympics.

Notes
 Viktor Ahn, with 6 gold medals, has the most Olympic golds in short track.
 Italian Arianna Fontana, with eleven medals among the women's and Viktor Ahn and Apolo Anton Ohno among the men's, with eight medals each have the most Olympic medals in short track.

Number of athletes by nation

See also
List of Olympic venues in short track speed skating

References

External links

 
Sports at the Winter Olympics
Olympics